Archotermopsidae is a family of termites in the order Blattodea, known as dampwood termites, formerly included within the family Termopsidae. They constitute a small and rather primitive family with two extant genera and 5 living species. They may rarely infest structures but do not usually do so, nor do they cause extensive damage to buildings or other man-made structures unless said structure has been sufficiently damaged such as by water. As their name implies, they eat wood that is not dried out, perhaps even rotting, and consequently of little use to humans.

Taxonomy
In 2009, the five extant genera from the family Termopsidae (Archotermopsis, Hodotermopsis, Porotermes, Stolotermes, and Zootermopsis) were moved to a newly created family, Archotermopsidae (Zootermopsis had previously been treated as part of the family Hodotermitidae), so that the family Termopsidae now includes only fossil taxa: Asiatermes, Huaxiatermes, and Mesotermopsis (Early Cretaceous of China); Cretatermes carpenteri (Upper Cretaceous of Labrador); Lutetiatermes prisca (Upper Cretaceous amber of France); Paleotermopsis oligocenicus (Upper Oligocene of France); Parotermes insignis (Oligocene of Colorado); and Valditermes (incertae sedis). The genera Porotermes and Stolotermes were later placed into a separate family, Stolotermitidae. 

As of April 6, 2022, the genus Hodotermopsis has been moved to the newly elevated family Hodotermopsidae, leaving Archotermopsidae with Archotermopsis and Zootermopsis as its only extant genera.

References

Further reading

External links
Dampwood Termite Fact Sheet from the National Pest Management Association with information on habits, habitat and prevention
Potential Impact of Management Alternatives for Dampwood Termites - California Department of Pesticide Regulation

Termites
Blattodea_families
Taxa named by Michael S. Engel